Amedzofe is a settlement north of Ho in the mountainous region of the Ho Municipal District of the Volta Region of Ghana. It is presently located in the newly created Ho-West District Assembly. Amedzofe is a settlement in the mountains, and can boast of four natural gifts: the Ote [otay] Falls, Mount Gemi, the weather and the landscape. It has played a role in the 19th-century Anglo-Ashanti Wars. The Amedzofe Training School was built in 1880 by German missionaries. It is the home of the oldest EP Church in the Avatime Traditional Area that was built in 1889 by the Germans.

References

See also
Amedzofe (history) for Amedzofe in Ewe oral history.

Populated places in the Volta Region